Monzavous "Rae" Edwards (born May 7, 1981) is an American sprint athlete who specialises in the 100 meters.

Edwards began his career as a junior athlete in 2000, winning the USA Junior and Junior College (JUCO) championships in the 100 and 200 meters races. He competed at the 2000 World Junior Championships in Athletics and reached the semifinals of the 100 m and quarterfinals of the 200 m. He reached the final of the USA Outdoor Championships in Track and Field in 2003, setting a personal record of 10.09 seconds. He competed at the US Olympic trials for the 2004 Athens Olympics, but did not progress beyond the quarterfinals. He received a public warning that year from the United States Anti-Doping Agency after he tested positive for tetrahydrocannabinol, a compound found in marijuana, which is regarded as a minor infraction. At the 2005 US Outdoor Championships, he posted a personal record tying 10.09 s before finishing sixth in the 100 m final. As a result, he was selected as an alternate for the United States relay team at the 2005 World Championships in Athletics, but he did not compete. At the end of the 2005 season, he ran a new personal best of 10.08 seconds in Malmö, Sweden.

The 2006 and 2007 seasons were largely uneventful, although he was part of the bronze-medal winning relay team at the 2007 Pan American Games. Edwards returned in 2008 to compete at the US Olympic trials for the Beijing Games. He finished tenth in the semifinals but recorded a new best of 10.06 seconds in the qualifying rounds. At the start of the following outdoor season, he significantly improved his 200 m best from 20.46 to 20.17 seconds at the Grande Premio Brasil Caixa de Atletismo. The following month, he improved his 100 m record to 10.02 seconds at the Fanny Blankers-Koen Games in Hengelo, finishing second behind Churandy Martina. Edwards finished third in the national championships with a wind-aided run of 10.00 seconds, gaining qualification into his first ever major senior championships, the 2009 World Championships in Athletics, along with Mike Rodgers and Darvis Patton.

Personal bests

All information taken from IAAF profile.

See also
List of doping cases in athletics

References

External links
 
 
 Yahoo season profile

1981 births
Living people
People from Opelika, Alabama
Nigerian male sprinters
American male sprinters
African-American male track and field athletes
Pan American Games track and field athletes for the United States
Pan American Games bronze medalists for the United States
Athletes (track and field) at the 2007 Pan American Games
Athletes (track and field) at the 2011 Pan American Games
Commonwealth Games competitors for Nigeria
Athletes (track and field) at the 2014 Commonwealth Games
Junior college men's track and field athletes in the United States
Doping cases in athletics
American sportspeople in doping cases
Athletes (track and field) at the 2016 Summer Olympics
Olympic athletes of Nigeria
Pan American Games medalists in athletics (track and field)
World Athletics Championships athletes for the United States
Medalists at the 2011 Pan American Games
21st-century African-American sportspeople
20th-century African-American people